The People's Institute refers to organizations set up in different localities:

 People's Institute, Manchester
 People's Institute, New York